Livingstone Adjin (born 12 April 1989) is a Ghanaian footballer who plays for Primera División Venezolana side Estudiantes de Mérida.

References

External links
Livingstone Adjin at playmakerstats.com (English version of calciozz.it)
profile

1989 births
Living people
Ghanaian footballers
Ghanaian expatriate footballers
Cypriot First Division players
Cypriot Second Division players
Doxa Katokopias FC players
Othellos Athienou F.C. players
Expatriate footballers in Cyprus
Ghanaian expatriate sportspeople in Cyprus
F.C. AK players
Trujillanos FC players
A.C.C.D. Mineros de Guayana players
Association football midfielders
Expatriate footballers in Venezuela